Thomas Zenke (born 30 January 1993) is a Nigerian international footballer who plays for Enyimba, as a winger.

Career
He has played club football for ABS, Enyimba and Nasarawa United.

In January 2016, Zenke travelled to Malta for negotiations with Mosta FC. But he was left disappointed after learning what he will be earning which was far less than what he was told when he agreed to travel to Malta. He then travelled back to Nigeria and continued playing for Nasarawa United.

Zenke rejoined Enyimba in January 2019.

National career
He made his international debut for Nigeria in 2017.

Personal life
His older brother Simon is also a footballer.

References

1993 births
Living people
Nigerian footballers
Nigeria international footballers
ABS F.C. players
Enyimba F.C. players
Nasarawa United F.C. players
Association football wingers